Tominaga Dam (富永ダム) is a dam in the city of Toyota in the Aichi Prefecture of Japan.

History 

After the Second World War, Chubu Electric Power, which had been expanding its power supply facilities, made plans to construct their fourth large-scale pumped-storage hydroelectric plant in the Yahagi River system following the Hatanagi, Takane, and Mazegawa dams. 

Hydroelectric power stations in Japan
Dams in Aichi Prefecture
Dams completed in 1980